Vivan Sundaram (born 28 May 1943) is an Indian contemporary artist. His parents were Kalyan Sundaram, Chairman of Law Commission of India from 1968 to 1971, and Indira Sher-Gil, sister of noted Indian modern artist Amrita Sher-Gil. He is married to art historian and critic Geeta Kapur.

Training
Sundaram was educated at The Doon School, the Faculty of Fine Arts, Maharaja Sayajirao University of Baroda, and at Slade School of London. In London he met the British-American painter R. B. Kitaj, under whom he trained for some time.

Work

Sundaram works in many different media, including painting, sculpture, printmaking, photography, installation and video art, and his work is politically conscious and highly intertextual in nature. His works in the 1980s showed a tendency towards figurative representations, and dealt with problems of identity. His works constantly refer to social problems, popular culture, problems of perception, memory and history. He was among the first Indian artists to work with installation. His latest installations and videos often refer to his artistic influences, among them are Dadaism, Surrealism, as well as more recent Fluxus and the works of Joseph Beuys.

Re-take of ‘Amrita’ is a series of black and white digital photomontages based on archival photographs from the Sher-Gil family. The original photographer was Sundaram's grandfather Umrao Singh. Sundaram reconfigured the photographs and recast the family in new roles, retelling family history.

See also

References

External links
 at Indian Art Circle
 at Contemporary Indian Art
 at Culturebase, International Artists' Database
 at Artists.org
 

1943 births
Living people
Indian people of Jewish descent
Indian male painters
Indian photographers
Indian people of Hungarian-Jewish descent
Jewish painters
The Doon School alumni
Alumni of the Slade School of Fine Art
Maharaja Sayajirao University of Baroda alumni
Indian installation artists
20th-century Indian painters
20th-century Indian male artists